Benissanó is a municipality in the comarca of Camp de Túria in the Valencian Community, Spain.

Geography 
Located at the southeast of the city of Llíria, Benissanó is surrounded by the four cardinal points. The surface is flat, except for some gentle undulations in the northeastern area. The climate is temperate; the most frequent winds are westerly and easterly; rains occur in autumn and spring. The village is located on a mezzanine, next to the road from Valencia to Ademús.

References 

Municipalities in Camp de Túria
Populated places in Camp de Túria